This is a list of people from The Hague.

Politicians

See also: List of mayors of The Hague
 Jozias van Aartsen (born 1947), former foreign minister; former Mayor of The Hague
 Ivo Daalder (born 1960), the US permanent representative to NATO, 2009 to 2013.l
 Wim Deetman (born 1945), Speaker of the Dutch parliament 1989 to 1996 & former Mayor of The Hague
 Willem Drees (1886–1988), former Prime Minister of the Netherlands
 Machiel de Graaf (born 1969), politician
 Andries Cornelis Dirk de Graeff (1872-1958), Governor General of Dutch East Indies, Dutch minister for foreign affairs, diplomat
 Dirk de Graeff van Polsbroek (1833-1916), Diplomat, Generalconsul and Dutch minister in Japan
 Dirk Georg de Graeff (1905–1986), chamberlain of the Dutch queens and managing director from the Algemene Bank Nederland
 Jan Pronk (born 1940), United Nations' special representative for Sudan
 Mark Rutte (born 1967), current Prime Minister of the Netherlands

Royalty (actual heads of state only)

 Annemarie, Duchess of Parma (born 1977)
 Queen Beatrix, (born 1938)
 Queen Juliana, (1909–2004) 
 Queen Wilhelmina, (1880–1962).
 King William I, (1772–1843). 
 King William II, (1792–1849).
 King William III, (1817–1890). 
 William II, Prince of Orange, (Stadtholder) (1626–1650). 
 William III, (Stadtholder, King William III of England), (1650–1702).
 William IV, Prince of Orange (1711–1751).
 William V, (Stadtholder), (1748–1806).
 Sophia of Hanover, (1630–1714).

Arts

 Jurriaan Andriessen (1925-1996), composer
 Hendrik Petrus Berlage (1856–1934), architect.
 Theo Bitter (1916–1994), graphic artist, painter and draftsman. 
 Ferdinand Bordewijk (1884–1965), author
 Lodewijk Bruckman (1903–1995), magic realist painter. 
 Dirk Bus (1907-1978), sculptor.
 Dash Berlin (formed 2007), electronic music duo
 Blasterjaxx (formed 2010), DJ and record producer duo
 Remco Campert (born 1929), author, poet and columnist.
 Simon Carmiggelt (1913–1987), writer, journalist and poet 
 Thomas Cletcher (1598–1666) jeweller, goldsmith and gem dealer; mayor of The Hague, 1652 to 1657.  
 Louis Couperus (1863–1923), novelist and poet.
 Demiak (born 1967), pseudonym of Maarten Demmink, painter, photographer and sculptor.
 Glowinthedark (formed 2009), DJ and record production duo
 Jacob Derwig (born 1969), actor
 Diddo (born 1977), the artist name of Diddo Velema, conceptual artist and designer.
 Jacob Gestman Geradts (born 1951), engineer, historian and pin-up artist
 Golden Earring (1961-2021), Nederbeat rock band
 Gruppo Sportivo (formed 1976) pop band
 Cornelis de Hooghe (1541-1583) illegitimate son of Emperor Charles V, engraver
 Constantijn Huygens (1596–1687), Dutch Golden Age poet and composer.
 Kane (1998–2014), pop rock band
 Jan Jakob Lodewijk ten Kate (1819–1889), a divine, prose writer and poet.
 Imran Khan (born 1984), a Dutch-Punjabi singer and songwriter. 
 Sander Kleinenberg (born 1971), dance music DJ and record producer. 
 Martin Koolhoven (born 1969), film director and screenwriter.
 Legowelt (born ca.1970), real name Danny Wolfers, electronic musician
 Jacques van Lier (1875–1951), cellist and teacher
 Mark Norman (formed 2001), DJ duo
 Johannes Secundus (1511–1536) a New Latin poet.
 Shocking Blue (1967-1974) Nederbeat music group, known for the song "Venus"
 Marinus Snoeren (1919–1982), classical musician (cello)
 Carel Struycken (born 1948), actor, Addams Family and Star Trek
 Marjo Tal (1915-2006), composer and pianist
 Anouk Teeuwe (born 1975), known as Anouk, singer and songwriter
 Ernest Thoen (1946–2011) black and white portrait photographer
 Aldous Byron Valensia Clarkson (born 1971), known as Valensia, composer, producer and multi-instrumentalist.
 Wieteke van Dort (born 1943), actress, comedian, singer and writer.
 Marcel van Eeden (born 1965), draftsman and painter.
 Theo van Gogh (1957–2004) director, film and TV producer, actor and author.
 Van Kooten en De Bie (formed 1963), comedy duo
 Nancy van Overveldt (1930-2015) artist
 Adrian Vandenberg (born 1954), rock guitarist
 Max Velthuijs (1923–2005) painter, children's illustrator and writer.
 Georgina Verbaan (born 1979), actress and singer.
 Paul Verhoeven (born 1938), film director and screenwriter
 Johannes Vermeer (1632–1675), painter.
 Carel Vosmaer (1826–1888), poet and art critic.
 Flore Zoé (born 1975), a fine art and fashion photographer

Science & Business 

 Jacob Golius (1596–1667) an Orientalist and mathematician.
 Samuel Goudsmit (1902 –1978) - Dutch-American physicist
 Roland Greefkes (1941-2021) blacksmith
 Christiaan Huygens (1629–1695) astronomer, physicist, mathematician; member of the Royal Society; inventor of the pendulum clock and the pocket watch.
 Zacharias Janssen (1585 – pre-1632) a spectacle-maker; often credited with the first known creation of a compound microscope, otherwise previously credited with the optical telescope.
 Walter Lewin (born 1936) Astrophysicist and former professor of physics at the Massachusetts Institute of Technology.
 Simon van der Meer (1925–2011) Nobel Prize in Physics, 1984
 Guido van Rossum (born 1956) designer of Python (programming language)
 Jan Tinbergen (1903–1994) economist, won the Nobel Prize for economics, 1969
 Niko Tinbergen (1907–1988) Nobel Prize in Physiology or Medicine, 1973

Sport

 Dick Advocaat (born 1947), football player, former coach of Netherlands national football team
 Peter Blangé (born 1964) volleyball player, gold medallist at the 1996 Summer Olympics
 Michael Boogerd (born 1972), cyclist, winner of two stages of the Tour de France
 Niels Feijen (born 1977), pool player, won the 2014 WPA World Nine-ball Championship
 Dan Gadzuric (born 1978), former National Basketball Association player
 Robin Haase  (born 1987), professional tennis player
 Thom Harinck (born 1943), kickboxing trainer
 David Huddleston (born 2000), a Bulgarian gymnast.
 Martin Jol (born 1956), former football player; former coach of AFC Ajax.
 Ties Kruize (born 1952), former Olympic field hockey player
 Tim Krul  (born 1988), football goalkeeper with Norwich City F.C.
 Alex Lely (born 1973), former professional pool player.
 Roland Scholten (born 1965), former professional darts player
 Erica Terpstra (born 1943), 1964 Olympic swimming champion, former sports minister and current President of the Dutch Olympic Committee
 Raymond van Barneveld (born 1967), professional darts player, 5-time world champion
 Daan van Bunge (born 1982), cricketer, twice represented Netherlands in Cricket World Cup
 Bart Veldkamp (born 1967), 1992 Olympic Speed Skating Champion (10 km)
 Joop Zoetemelk (born 1946), former racing cyclist, won the 1980 Tour de France
 Sarina Wiegman (born 1969), football player, coach of the Lionesses

Miscellaneous

 Lucia de Berk (born 1961) nurse, convicted in 2003 of three murders and three attempted murders, exonerated in 2010
 Demetrius Augustine Gallitzin (1770–1840) emigre Russian aristocrat and Catholic priest.
 Conrad Busken Huet (1826–1886) a pastor, journalist and literary critic.
 Hendrik Jut (1851–1878) murderer
 Charles van der Leeuw (born 1952) journalist
 Pieter Melvill van Carnbee (1816–1856) geographer.
 Baruch Spinoza (1632–1677) philosopher, moved to The Hague in 1670, where he finished his Ethics; died aged 44.
 Alexine Tinne (1835–1869) an explorer in Africa and photographer.

References

 
Hague